Live from the Royal Albert Hall is the fourth live album by American blues rock musician Joe Bonamassa. Recorded on May 4, 2009, at the Royal Albert Hall in London, England, it was released on September 22, 2009 by J&R Adventures.

Reception

Music website AllMusic gave Live from the Royal Albert Hall four out of five stars, with reviewer Steve Leggett describing the album as "simply wonderful, full of great guitar playing, solid singing, and with a horn section and double drummers on board, the sound is full and even majestic".

Track listing

Personnel

Primary musical performers
Joe Bonamassa – guitar, vocals, liner notes
Carmine Rojas – bass
Anton Fig – drums
Bogie Bowles – drums
Rick Melick – keyboards, tambourine, backing vocals
Additional musicians
Sean Freeman – saxophone
Lee Thornburg – trumpet, brass arrangements
Mike Feltham – trombone
Eric Clapton – guitar, vocals (guest appearance)
Paul Jones – harmonica (guest appearance)

Production personnel
Kevin Shirley – production, mixing
Josh Shirley – mixing assistance
Britannia Row Studios – recording, engineering
Barry MacLeod – engineering assistance
Ryan Smith – mastering
Sam Dunn – direction
Scot McFadyen – direction
Dave Pattenden – production
Lisa Grootenboer – editing
Dennis Friel – graphic design
Marcus Bird – photography and direction
Christine Goodwin – photography

Chart performance

Certifications

References

2009 live albums
Joe Bonamassa albums
Albums produced by Kevin Shirley
Live albums recorded at the Royal Albert Hall

pt:Live From The Royal Albert Hall